Drosera sect. Erythrorhiza is a section of 14 species of tuberous species in the genus Drosera. It represents a natural group of all the rosetted tuberous Drosera. Most species are endemic to Western Australia, but D. aberrans, D. praefolia, D. schmutzii, and D. whittakeri are also found in eastern Australia.

The section was first formally described by Jules Émile Planchon in 1848 as series Erythrorhizae. Ludwig Diels reclassified the genus in his 1906 monograph of the family, recognizing this section, now spelled Erythrorhiza, within subgenus Ergaleium.

See also 
List of Drosera species

References 

sect. Erythrorhiza
Plant sections